Pan is the innermost named moon of Saturn. It is a small, walnut-shaped moon approximately 35 kilometres across and 23 km wide that orbits within the Encke Gap in Saturn's A Ring. Pan is a ring shepherd and is responsible for keeping the Encke Gap free of ring particles. It is sometimes described as having the appearance of a ravioli.

It was discovered by Mark R. Showalter in 1990 from analysis of old Voyager 2 probe photos and received the provisional designation  because the discovery images dated back to 1981.

Prediction and discovery
The existence of a moon in the Encke Gap was first predicted by Jeffrey N. Cuzzi and Jeffrey D. Scargle in 1985, based on wavy edges of the gap which indicated a gravitational disturbance. In 1986 Showalter et al. inferred its orbit and mass by modeling its gravitational wake. They arrived at a very precise prediction of 133,603 ± 10 km for the semi-major axis and a mass of 5–10 Saturn masses, and inferred that there was only a single moon within the Encke gap. The actual semi-major axis differs by 19 km and the actual mass is 8.6 of Saturn's.

The moon was later found within 1° of the predicted position. The search was undertaken by considering all Voyager 2 images and using a computer calculation to predict whether the moon would be visible under sufficiently favorable conditions in each one. Every qualifying Voyager 2 image with resolution better than ~50 km/pixel shows Pan clearly. In all, it appears in eleven Voyager 2 images.

Name
The moon was named on 16 September 1991, after the mythological Pan, who was (among other things) the god of shepherds.  This is a reference to Pan's role as a shepherd moon.  It is also designated .

Orbit
The eccentricity of Pan's orbit causes its distance from Saturn to vary by ~4 km.  Its inclination, which would cause it to move up and down, is not distinguishable from zero with present data.  The Encke Gap, within which Pan orbits, is about 325 km wide.

Geography

Cassini scientists have described Pan as "walnut-shaped" owing to the equatorial ridge, similar to that on Atlas, that is visible in images. The ridge is due to ring material that Pan has swept up from the Encke gap. It has been referred to by journalists as a space empanada, a form of stuffed bread or pastry, as well as a ravioli. A new study suggests that the bizarre shape of Pan could also be due to collisions between tiny moonlets, thus causing them to merge and form Pan (known as the pyramidal regime formation scenario).

Pandean ringlet
The Encke Gap contains a ringlet that is coincident with Pan's orbit, indicating that Pan maintains the particles in horseshoe orbits. A second ringlet is periodically disrupted by Pan, similarly to how the F Ring is disturbed by Prometheus.

Gallery

See also
List of natural satellites

References
Notes

Citations

External links 

 Pan Profile by NASA's Solar System Exploration
 The Planetary Society: Pan

Moons of Saturn
19900716
Moons with a prograde orbit